Wombling Free is a 1977 British film adaptation of the children's television series The Wombles. Directed by Lionel Jeffries, it stars The Wombles, David Tomlinson, Frances de la Tour, and Bonnie Langford.

Plot
Based on the BBC children's series, this film charts the adventures of the Wombles, a colony of small litter-picking creatures who live in Wimbledon Common in 1970s London.

Great Uncle Bulgaria Womble recounts the story of how Wombles have always been cleaning up after humans from the very beginning with Adam and Eve, and how Wombles continue to clean up after humans for generations up to the present day all around the world, including the United States, Russia, and India. Only seen by those who believe in them, their work goes largely unnoticed until a young girl, Kim, spots them and their worthwhile purpose. As she invites them to her birthday party, her father is forced to believe as he comes face to face with Orinoco, Tobermory and the others. A public meeting is set to prove to the local population that the Wombles do exist and should be aided in their anti-rubbish campaign. But on the day in question, a storm breaks out over the Common.

At the end, Kim, Wombles and all the children help in cleaning up Wimbledon Common.

Cast

Humans
 David Tomlinson as Roland Frogmorton
 Frances de la Tour as Julia Frogmorton, Roland's wife
 Bonnie Langford as Felicity 'Kim' Frogmorton, Julia & Roland's daughter
 Bernard Spear as Arnold Takahashi
 Yasuko Nagazumi as Doris Takahashi
 John Junkin as County Surveyor
 Reg Lye as Assistant Surveyor

Wombles
The Womble characters were portrayed by diminutive actors Kenny Baker as Bungo the drummer, Eileen Baker as Tobermory the keyboardist, Sadie Corre as Madame Cholet the saxophonist, Tony Friel as Wellington the lead guitarist, John Lummiss as MacWomble the rhythm guitarist, Jack Purvis as Great Uncle Bulgaria the violinist and music director, Albert Wilkinson as Tomsk the bassist, and Marcus Powell as Orinoco the lead singer. Womble voices were provided by David Jason, Janet Brown, Jon Pertwee, John Graham and Lionel Jeffries.

Soundtrack
An accompanying soundtrack was released by CBS featuring a selection of Mike Batt's score cues plus new recordings and remixes of previous Womble songs as featured in the film. No items from this album have ever appeared on any Wombles compilation, but in 2011 the soundtrack was released on CD by the Dramatico label.

 "The Wombling Song (Film Version)"
 "The Creation Of The World (Main Title)"
 "Edinburgh Rock"
 "Introduction From Minuetto Allegretto"
 "Introduction To The Womble Burrow"
 "Wombling White Tie & Tails (Film Version)"
 "Under The Hills And Not Far Away"
 "Madame Cholet"
 "Mr. Roland Frogmorton's Music"
 "Miss Felicity Kim Frogmorton's Music"
 "Frogmorton's Theme"
 "The March Of The Machines"
 "Exercise Is Good For You (Film Version)"
 "The Underground Garden"
 "Count Down And Lift-Off"
 "Womble Of The Universe"
 "The Queen"

Production
Wombling Free was part of a slate of films made in the late 70s by the Rank Organisation, who re-entered the filmmaking arena.

Locations
Most exterior shots were filmed in Black Park in Wexham and Gerrards Cross, Buckinghamshire.

Reception
Philip French, film critic for The Observer, called the film "abysmal".

References

External links
 
 Wombling Free at Letterbox DVD

1977 films
1970s musical fantasy films
British musical fantasy films
British children's fantasy films
Films shot at Pinewood Studios
Animated films based on children's books
Films directed by Lionel Jeffries
The Wombles
1970s children's fantasy films
1970s English-language films
1970s British films